Phil Eaglestone (born 17 June 1982) is an English-born Irish cricketer. Primarily a left-arm seamer, Eaglestone made his One Day International debut for Ireland in 2008. Two years later he played his first Twenty20 International.

Career

Domestic
Phil Eaglestone's plays for his local club, that of Strabane. He first represented Ireland in 2008. In his first season playing for them in the Friends Provident Trophy (FPT), he featured in four games, taking five wickets at an average of 22.40. His debut match was against Nottinghamshire on 27 April 2008. He opened the bowling with Kevin O'Brien and finished with figures of 10–2–49–2; his wickets were those of Will Jefferson and Graeme Swann. He was forced to miss one FPT game in May 2008 due to a knee injury.

International career
Before making his senior team debut, Eagleston represented Ireland A against Denmark and Marylebone Cricket Club. Although Eaglestone was part of the 15-man squad that toured Bangladesh in early 2008, he did not play on the tour. He made his international debut on 1 July 2008, playing against New Zealand in a One Day International (ODI) as part of the 2008 Associates Tri-Series in Scotland. Ireland lost the match, which was played in Scotland, by 290 runs. Eaglestone opened the bowling with fellow seamer Peter Connell – who was also on debut – and finished with figures of 7–0–60–1 as New Zealand amassed 402 from their 50 overs. The first wicket Eaglestone took was that of Brendon McCullum for 166.

Although he was selected in Ireland's squad for the European Cricket Championship, held later in July 2008, a suspected stress fracture of the tibia (shin) led to his withdrawal. The injury also prevented him from playing in the Twenty20 World Cup qualifiers in August 2008.

References

External links
 

1982 births
Living people
Cricketers from Beckenham
Ireland One Day International cricketers
Ireland Twenty20 International cricketers
Irish cricketers
Northern Knights cricketers